Marie Gertrude Hammontree (June 19, 1913 - December 7, 2012) was an American children's author known for her biographies of famous people. Her works include Albert Einstein, Young Thinker and Walt Disney, Young Movie Maker.

Life and career 

Marie was born in Jefferson County, Indiana to Harry Clay and Hatie Agnes Hamontree. She and her family eventually moved to Indianapolis. She graduated from Arsenal Technical High School in 1929. She soon after began taking classes at Butler University but eventually dropped out.

References

1913 births
2012 deaths
American children's writers
People from Jefferson County, Indiana